Min-plus matrix multiplication, also known as distance product, is an operation on matrices.

This is standard matrix multiplication for the semi-ring of tropical numbers in the min convention.

This operation is closely related to the shortest path problem.

References 
 Uri Zwick. 2002. All pairs shortest paths using bridging sets and rectangular matrix multiplication. J. ACM 49, 3 (May 2002), 289–317.
 Liam Roditty and Asaf Shapira. 2008. All-Pairs Shortest Paths with a Sublinear Additive Error. ICALP '08, Part I, LNCS 5125, pp. 622–633, 2008.

See also 
 Floyd–Warshall algorithm
 Tropical geometry

Graph products
Graph distance